The 2010 Ukrainian Cup Final was a football match that was played place at the Metalist Stadium, Kharkiv, on 16 May 2010. The match was the 19th Ukrainian Cup final and was contested by Metalurh Donetsk and Tavriya Simferopol. The final was the second time a Ukrainian Cup final was held in Kharkiv. The Ukrainian Cup winners qualified for the 2010–11 UEFA Europa League play-off round. Tavriya played in their second cup final after last appearing in 1994, where the side lost to Chornomorets Odessa on penalty kicks (5–3) after the matched finished 0–0 after extra time. Metalurh Donetsk were playing in their first cup final.

Road to Kharkiv 

All 16 Ukrainian Premier League clubs do not have to go through qualification to get into the competition; Tavriya and Metalurh therefore both qualified automatically for the competition.

Previous encounters 
Tavriya had met Metalurh Donetsk previously in the Ukrainian Cup competition in the quarter-Final of the 2003–04 edition. In that match, Tavriya advanced on penalty kicks 10–9 after the score finished 1–1 after extra time.

Match details

See also
 2009–10 Ukrainian Premier League

References

External links 

Cup Final
Ukrainian Cup finals
Ukrainian Cup Final 2010
Ukrainian Cup Final 2010
Ukrainian Cup Final 2010
May 2010 sports events in Ukraine